The 2014 South Dakota gubernatorial election took place on November 4, 2014, to elect the Governor and Lieutenant Governor of South Dakota, concurrently with the election of South Dakota's Class II U.S. Senate seat, as well as other elections to the United States Senate in other states and elections to the United States House of Representatives and various state and local elections.

Incumbent Republican governor Dennis Daugaard ran for re-election to a second term in office. He won the Republican primary and ran again with incumbent lieutenant governor Matt Michels. The Democrats nominated State Representative Susan Wismer, who chose former state representative Susy Blake as her running mate. Independent Mike Myers also ran, whose running mate was former Republican state representative Lora Hubbel.

Republican primary

Candidates

Declared
 Dennis Daugaard, incumbent governor
 Lora Hubbel, former state representative and former chair of the Minnehaha County Republican Party

Declined
 Stan Adelstein, state senator
 Stace Nelson, state representative (running for the U.S. Senate)

Results

Democratic primary

Candidates

Declared
 Joe Lowe, former state director of wildland fire suppression and former mayor of Mission Viejo, California
 Susan Wismer, state representative

Declined
 Jason Frerichs, Minority Leader of the South Dakota Senate
 Bryce Healy, former commissioner of schools and public lands
 Scott Heidepriem, former state senator and nominee for governor in 2010
 Stephanie Herseth Sandlin, former U.S. Representative
 Mike Huether, Mayor of Sioux Falls (running for re-election)
 Steve Jarding, educator, lecturer and political consultant
 Pat O'Brien, author, television anchor and radio host

Results

Independents and Third Parties

Candidates

Declared
 Mike Myers (Independent), former University of South Dakota School of Law professor and former CEO of Mayo Clinic
 Running mate: Lora Hubbel, former Republican State Representative and Republican candidate for governor in 2014. Myers' initial running mate was Caitlin Collier, an attorney and Democratic candidate for the State House in 2008. After Collier announced her withdrawal from the race in June 2014 because of a family illness, Myers attempted to replace her with Hubbel, who had run against Daugaard in the Republican primary. However, Secretary of State of South Dakota Jason Gant refused to remove Collier's name, saying that state law had no provision for replacing an Independent candidate on the ballot. In July, Myers sued the Secretary of State to allow him to change his running mate and on August 18, federal judge Lawrence L. Piersol of the United States District Court for the District of South Dakota ruled in Myers' favor.

Failed to make the ballot
 Curtis Strong (Constitution), Tea Party activist

General election

Predictions

Polling

Results

See also
 2014 United States Senate elections
 2014 United States elections

References

External links
 South Dakota gubernatorial election, 2014 at Ballotpedia

Official campaign websites (Archived)
 Dennis Daugaard
 Lora Hubbel
 Joe Lowe
 Mike Myers
 Curtis Strong
 Susan Wismer

gubernatorial
South Dakota
2014